Mr. Kaplan is a 2014 Uruguayan comedy-drama film directed by Álvaro Brechner. It was selected as the Uruguayan entry for the Best Foreign Language Film at the 87th Academy Awards, but was not nominated.

Cast
 Héctor Noguera as Jacobo (joint win with Nestor Guzzini - Havana Star Prize for Best Actor at 16th Havana Film Festival New York)
 Néstor Guzzini as Contreras 
 Rolf Becker as Julius Reich
 Nidia Telles as Rebeca
 Nuria Fló as Lottie
 Leonor Svarcas as Estrella
 Gustavo Saffores as Isaac
 Hugo Piccinini as Elias
 Jorge Bolani as Kilgman

See also
 List of submissions to the 87th Academy Awards for Best Foreign Language Film
 List of Uruguayan submissions for the Academy Award for Best Foreign Language Film

References

External links
 

2014 films
2014 comedy-drama films
Uruguayan comedy-drama films
2010s Spanish-language films